Jean-Santos N'Diela Muntubila (20 December 1958), nicknamed Santos, is a Congolese former professional football player and manager.

He played for AS Bilima Kinshasa, FC Sochaux-Montbéliard, Olympique de Marseille, 1. FC Saarbrücken, SC Bastia, US Valenciennes and ESA Brive.

References

External links
 
 

1958 births
Living people
Footballers from Kinshasa
Democratic Republic of the Congo footballers
Democratic Republic of the Congo international footballers
Association football midfielders
Ligue 1 players
Ligue 2 players
Bundesliga players
2. Bundesliga players
AS Dragons players
FC Sochaux-Montbéliard players
Olympique de Marseille players
1. FC Saarbrücken players
SC Bastia players
Valenciennes FC players
ESA Brive players
1988 African Cup of Nations players
Democratic Republic of the Congo football managers
Democratic Republic of the Congo national football team managers
Democratic Republic of the Congo expatriate footballers
Democratic Republic of the Congo expatriate sportspeople in France
Expatriate footballers in France
Democratic Republic of the Congo expatriate sportspeople in Germany
Expatriate footballers in Germany
21st-century Democratic Republic of the Congo people